The Tohoku Rakuten Golden Eagles are a professional baseball team based in Sendai, Miyagi, Japan. The Eagles are members of the Pacific League (PL) in Nippon Professional Baseball (NPB). In baseball, the head coach of a team is called the manager, or more formally, the field manager. The duties of the team manager include team strategy and leadership on and off the field. Since their inaugural season in 2005, the Eagles have employed nine managers. Under the franchise's first manager, Yasushi Tao, the team finished last in the PL and was the first PL team in 40 years to lose over 90 games in a single season. Despite being signed to a three-year contract, Tao was dismissed after the Eagles' inaugural season. He was replaced by Hall of Famer Katsuya Nomura for the next season. During his four-year managerial tenure, Nomura accumulated 256 wins and a .459 winning percentage. Despite leading the team to its first Climax Series appearance in 2009, Eagles' management decided not to renew Nomura's contract. Instead, he was retained as an honorary manager through the 2012 season.

Marty Brown, Nomura's successor, signed a two-year managerial contract, however he was fired after only one last-place season with the Eagles. Instead, long-time manager Senichi Hoshino was hired and signed to a one-year, ¥150 million contract for the 2011 season. After a fifth-place PL finish and the positive development of the team's younger players, team owner Hiroshi Mikitani requested that Hoshino stay on as manager for the next few seasons. In the 2013 season, the Eagles' ninth, he went on to lead the team to its first PL pennant, first successful Climax Series run, and first Japan Series title. The following season, however, Hoshino missed two months with the team because of back problems and the Eagles finished in last place. At season's end, he stepped down as manager despite ownership wanting him to return for a fifth season. Hoshino and Nomura's four-year managerial tenures remain the team's longest. Hoshino was inducted into the Hall of Fame in 2017; his copper plaque depicts him wearing an Eagles cap.

Hiromoto Okubo, Rakuten's farm team manager, was named Hoshino's successor following his departure. He only lasted one season, however, as he resigned after the team again finished in last place. The team turned to veteran manager Masataka Nashida to fill the managerial vacancy for the 2016 season. Nashida was the last person to manage the Osaka Kintetsu Buffaloes before they were dissolved and merged after the 2004 season and appeared to be a natural choice to manage the Eagles, the team created to fill the void left by that merger. He was able to lead the team to its third playoff berth in 2017, however, the next season he resigned mid-season in July when the club dropped to 20 games below a .500 winning percentage.

Coach Yosuke Hiraishi acted as team's interim manager for the remainder of the 2018 season and was promoted to full-time manager for the 2019 season. Hiraishi was the first former Eagles player to manage the team. Despite leading the team to a Climax Series berth in 2019, Hiraishi's contract was not renewed. Eagles' general manager Kazuhisa Ishii was looking for someone capable of rebuilding the team. Hajime Miki, Rakuten's farm team manager, was hired to replace Hiraishi for the 2020 season. The previous season, Miki led the franchise's minor-league affiliate to the Eastern League championship title for the first time in its 15-year history. After only one fourth-place season, however, Ishii sent Miki back to manage the farm team and Rakuten instead appointed Ishii himself to manage the Eagles starting with the 2021 season.

Table key

Managers 
Statistics current through the 2022 season

References
General

Specific

Lists of Nippon Professional Baseball managers